Lundåkra Bay is a bight located at the eastern part of central Øresund, the sound between Danish Zealand and Swedish Scania. The bight is usually defined as the sea area between the Barsebäck peninsula in the South and Landskrona harbour and the artificial island known as Gråen in the North.

Most of the seafloor is covered with sand.

There is not even a minor fishing port along its shores, and the bight isn't particularly popular for summertime bathing either. The nearby Barsebäck Golf & Country Club, which at many occasions has hosted Scandinavian Masters and once Solheim Cup (in 2003) Golf competitions, has three seaside link holes at the shores of Lundåkrabukten. The Barsebäck Nuclear Power Plant, that produced electricity between 1975 and 2006, has been the major landmark in the bight's southern end.

References

External links 

Bights (geography)
Øresund
Geography of Landskrona
Bays of Sweden
Landforms of Skåne County
Ramsar sites in Sweden